Sant'Angelo Romano is a town and comune in Latium, Italy, administratively part of the Metropolitan City of Rome.  It is located north of Guidonia Montecelio, where the closest Trenitalia train station (about 40 minutes by train from Rome) is located.

Main sights
Sights in Sant'Angelo Romano include the Orsini-Cesi castle, which lies on the top of the old town. The castle hosts a prehistorical museum. The main body of the castle is the palace of prince Federico Cesi, the founder of Accademia dei Lincei.

References